Royer may refer to:

Surnames
Alain de Royer-Dupré, French racehorse trainer
Alphonse Royer, French writer
Augustin Royer, French astronomer
Bentley Royer, a Dominican politician
Casey Royer, American drummer
Charles Royer, former mayor of Seattle
Clémence Royer (1830–1902), French scientist and feminist
Daniel Royer, Austrian footballer
Henri Royer, French painter
Hugh Royer Jr., American golfer
Joseph-Nicolas-Pancrace Royer, French composer
Lee "Rock" Royer, American football coach
Lionel Royer-Perreaut, French politician
Michelle Royer, former Miss USA
Mike Royer, a number of people of the same name
Pierre Paul Royer-Collard, French statesman and philosopher
William Royer, an American politician.

Places
Royer, Saône-et-Loire, a commune in the French region of Bourgogne
Royer, Pennsylvania, United States, a census-designated place
Le Royer Lake, one of the Obatogamau Lakes in Quebec, Canada

Other uses
Royer Labs, microphone company
Royer oscillator, an electronic component

See also
Royères, French commune in Haute-Vienne, Limousin
Florida v. Royer, US Supreme Court case relating to the Fourth Amendment